

See also 
 1798 and 1799 United States House of Representatives elections
 List of United States representatives from Virginia

Notes 

1799
Virginia
United States House of Representatives